Sonar Music was founded in 2010 by award winning composers Antony Partos, Andrew Lancaster, Matteo Zingales, David McCormack, Michael Lira, Jono Ma and music producer Wes Chew.
It is a music production house that provides original music composition and arrangements to all forms of media including Feature Films, Commercials, TV Series, Documentaries, Installations and Interactive media.

Sonar Music is situated at Fox Studios Australia. Its current board of directors are Antony Partos, Andrew Lancaster, Matteo Zingales, Jono Ma and David McCormack.

Awards 

Australian companies established in 2010
Music companies of Australia